Sandra Mortham, also known as Sandra Barringer (born January 4, 1951), is an American political who served as the 22nd Florida Secretary of State from 1995 to 1999.

Political career 
Mortham was a City Commissioner from Largo, Florida from 1982 to 1986 also serving as Vice Mayor in 1985–86.  She was a member of the Florida House of Representatives from 1987 to 1995 and was elected Republican Leader Pro Tempore in 1990-1992 and Republican Leader for the 1993-1994 legislative sessions. Mortham was the first woman in Florida's history to be nominated to be Speaker of the House.  She was the Secretary of State of Florida from 1995 to 1999. Mortham was defeated in the 1998 Republican primary by Katherine Harris.

References 

|-

|-

1951 births
Living people
Republican Party members of the Florida House of Representatives
Politicians from Erie, Pennsylvania
Secretaries of State of Florida
Women in Florida politics
Eckerd College alumni
21st-century American women